Becky Sandstedt is an American filmmaker and animal welfare activist. She investigated the conditions of downed animals on commercial farms and is a former investigator for Farm Sanctuary, an American animal protection organization that acts on behalf of farmed animals.

Sandstedt's investigation began after seeing a pamphlet about the treatment of "downers" at livestock markets − animals for sale who were too sick or injured to stand, and who might be left for days with no water, food or treatment. The material prompted her to visit a livestock market belonging to United Stockyards Corporation in South St. Paul, Minnesota. She worked at night as a cocktail waitress and visited the stockyard from October 1989 until May 1991, using a video camera she bought on credit for $75 a month. She requested a meeting with management in 1989 and again in June 1990 through the local humane society, and was told the problem was being dealt with.

The footage was reduced to 18 minutes by Farm Sanctuary, and published as "The Down Side of Livestock Marketing".

The story, and a planned protest at the stockyard organized by Farm Sanctuary, received broad coverage in the media, including on NBC's Nightly News and Tom Brokaw's television program "Expose." United Stockyards responded, just before NBC's segment regarding Sandstedt's independent investigation aired on May 19, by announcing a "no downer" policy at South St. Paul and the six other livestock markets the company owned; farmers would no longer be paid for downed animals, but instead the animals would be euthanized and the farmer charged a rendering fee. The company said Sandstedt had not influenced their decision, but had only determined the timing of their announcement. Farm Sanctuary later hired Sandstedt as an investigator. In 1991, she received the Animal Humanitarian of the Year award from the Animal Protection Institute.

Notes

References
Associated Press. "Champion of downed livestock", 13 May 1991.
Baur, Gene. Farm Sanctuary. Simon and Schuster, 2008.
Finsen, Lawrence and Finsen, Susan. The Animal Rights Movement in America. Twayne Publishers, 1994.
Reed, Susan. "Where's the Beef? Don't Ask", People magazine, 19 August 1991, Vol. 36, No. 6.
Rosenberg, Howard. "A Prize for a Video Muckraker Television: Becky Sandstedt's videocam helps stop cruelty inside the South St. Paul, Minn., stockyard", Los Angeles Times, 23 October 1991.
Wolfson, David J. "Beyond the Law: Agribusiness and the Systemic Abuse of Animals Raised for Food or Food Production", Animal Law, 2:123, 1995.

American animal welfare workers
Animal husbandry
Living people
Year of birth missing (living people)